Sigma Lupi, Latinized from σ Lupi, is a star in the southern constellation of Lupus. It is visible to the naked eye with an apparent visual magnitude of 4.4. Based upon an annual parallax shift of 5.67 mas as seen from Earth, it is located about 580 light years from the Sun. It is a member of the Upper Centaurus–Lupus subgroup of the nearby Sco OB2 association.

This is a B-type main sequence star with a stellar classification of B1/B2 V. Sigma Lupi is a Helium strong star with an enhanced abundance nitrogen and an underabundance of carbon. Jerzykiewicz and Sterken (1992) showed a small amplitude variability with a period of 3.02 days. This suggests it is a close binary system forming a rotating ellipsoidal variable, although other causes such as rotational modulation can not be ruled out. There is a higher frequency photometric variability with a rate of 10.93482 per day and an amplitude of 0.0031 in visual magnitude, but the cause of this is unknown.

At an age of just 13.4 million years, Sigma Lupi is spinning with a projected rotational velocity of 68 km/s giving it a rotation period of 3.02 days. A magnetic field has been detected with a polar field strength of around 500 G, which is varying longitudinally with an amplitude of around 100 G. The star has an estimated nine times the mass of the Sun and 4.8 times the Sun's radius. It is radiating 5,754 times the solar luminosity from its outer atmosphere at an effective temperature of around 23,000 K.

References

B-type main-sequence stars
Lupus (constellation)
Lupi, Sigma
Durchmusterung objects
127381
071121
5425
SX Arietis variables
Upper Centaurus Lupus